Shakuhachi meets Pena is a musical composition and performance, which is a collaboration of the performances of the traditional Japanese musical instrument Shakuhachi and the traditional Meitei musical instrument Pena. It is a maiden collaboration of traditional music between the two nations, India and Japan. It was performed by Motonaga Hiramu of Japan and Mayanglambam Mangangsana with his daughter Mangka Mayanglambam of Laihui, Imphal. It was performed at "The Giving Tree", Sangaiprou, Imphal West on the 28th of November, 2016. It was performed on the last day of a 3 day workshop on Shakuhachi conducted as a part of the "Manipur Japan Summit 2016". It was organised by the "Laihui" in collaboration with the "Art Heals Trust, Imphal, Manipur" and the "The Japan Foundation, New Delhi".

According to Motonaga Hiromu, both Shakuhachi and Pena (musical instrument) have their own traditional styles of playing and they need to create something new to represent the traditional Meitei music. He further said that it took his team 7 continuous days to bring out their collaborative performance.

Mangka Mayanglambam said that it took her 5 days in learning the Japanese lullaby "Komori Uta" completely. Motonaga Hiromu gave her the Japanese lyrics in Latin script. However, her pronunciations differ and Motonaga Hiromu corrected her everyday. Both Hiromu and Mangka concluded that the tonal vibrations of "Komori Uta", the Japanese lullaby were very much similar to the Meitei language lullaby named "Tha Tha Thabungton".

See also 
 Music of Japan
 Music of Manipur
 Nura Pakhang (Eu e Tu)

References 

Meitei-language songs
Japanese culture
Japanese-Meitei culture
Meitei culture
Meitei folklore in popular culture